Count Mikhail Fedotovich Kamensky (19 May 1738 – 12 August 1809) was a Russian Field Marshal prominent in the Catherinian wars and the Napoleonic campaigns.

Biography 
Mikhail Kamensky served as a volunteer in the French army in 1758-1759. He then took part in the Seven Years' War. In 1783, Kamensky was appointed Governor General of Ryazan and Tambov guberniyas. During the war with Turkey, in 1788, he defeated the Turks at the Moldavian settlement of Gangur. When prince Potemkin fell ill and entrusted his command of the army to Mikhail Kakhovsky, Kamensky refused to subordinate himself, referring to his seniority. For this, he was discharged from military service.

In 1797, Emperor Paul I granted Kamensky the title of count and made him retire. In 1806, Kamensky was appointed commander-in-chief of the Russian army in Prussia, which had been fighting the French armies of Napoleon. After six days of being in command, on the eve of the battle of Pułtusk, he transferred the command to Feodor Buxhoeveden under pretence of illness and left for his estate near Oryol.

Kamensky was notorious for his maltreatment of his serfs, and he was killed by one of them in 1809 at the age of 71. His death occasioned a sentimental poem by Vasily Zhukovsky. He was the father of Generals Sergei Kamensky and Nikolai Kamensky.

British actress Helen Mirren is one of his descendents.

References

 

Field marshals of Russia
Russian commanders of the Napoleonic Wars
Members of the State Council (Russian Empire)
Counts of the Russian Empire
Russian murder victims
1728 births
1809 deaths
People murdered in Russia
Recipients of the Order of St. George of the Second Degree
Recipients of the Order of St. George of the Third Degree
People of the Russo-Turkish War (1768–1774)